Giovanni Manzuoli (Giovanni Manzoli) (1720–1782) was an Italian castrato who sang as a soprano at the beginning of his career, and later as a contralto.

History

Born in Florence, Italy, Manzuoli began singing there in 1731. After performing in Verona in 1735, he relocated and performed in Naples until 1748, including at the recently built (1737) Teatro di San Carlo. He is documented as also singing and acting in the following locales for the years indicated:

 1749–1752 Madrid
 1754 Parma
 1755 Lisbon and Madrid
 1755–1764 various locales throughout Italy
 1760 Vienna
 1764–1765 London (King's Theatre)
 1768–1771 Milan

During Manzuoli's sojourn to London, he became friends with the Mozart family, later creating the role of Ascanio in Mozart's Ascanio in Alba, which premiered in 1771. While in Milan, he was appointed Chamber Singer to the Duke of Tuscany. His final appearance was in Milano in 1771. He died eleven years later.

Description of performance

Charles Burney, a contemporary music historian, described the Florentine castrato thus: "Manzoli's voice was the most powerful and voluminous soprano that had ever been heard on our stage since the time of Farinelli; and his manner of singing was grand and full of dignity. The applause he received was a universal thunder of acclimation."

References

External links 
 Giovanni Manzuoli in arte Succianoccioli 
 John A. Rice, "A Dispute Involving the musico Giovanni Manzoli and Mozart's Ascanio in Alba

Castrati
Italian opera singers
18th-century Italian male actors
Italian male stage actors
Musicians from Florence